Glasgow District is a Scottish amateur rugby union team which plays in the amateur Scottish Inter-District Championship. The side evolved into the professional provincial side Glasgow Warriors when the Scottish Rugby Union embraced professionalism. However the amateur district is still used for the representation of amateur players in the Inter-District Championship; and this amateur championship guides the selection of Scotland Club XV international players.

Founded in 1872 Glasgow District was a select provincial amateur rugby union team that drew its players mainly from the Greater Glasgow area, as well as others from the rest of the west of Scotland; roughly corresponding to the old Strathclyde regional council area. Historically the Glasgow District team played matches against touring teams visiting Scotland from abroad, and also competed in the Scottish Inter-District Championship.

The Glasgow District rugby union team was founded in 1872. The team played the world's first inter-district match that year against Edinburgh District rugby union team.

The amateur Glasgow District side evolved into the professional Glasgow Warriors side in 1996; one year after rugby union allowed professionalism in 1995.

Formation

The Glasgow District side was formed in 1872 to play against an Edinburgh District side.

The teams met on 23 November 1872 at Burnbank Park at Woodlands in Glasgow; and Edinburgh District won 1 drop goal – 0 in a 20-a-side fixture. This is the oldest inter-district match in the world and to mark this the current Glasgow Warriors and Edinburgh Rugby sides play for the 1872 Cup every year.

The first Glasgow team in 1872:-

 Thomas Chalmers (Glasgow Academicals), William Davie Brown (Glasgow Academicals),William Hamilton Kidston (West of Scotland)
 William Cross (Glasgow Academicals), T. A. Drew (Glasgow Academicals)
 George Buchanan McClure (West of Scotland), John Arthur (Glasgow Academicals) [Captain]
 John Kennedy Tod, Henry William Allan, Charles Chalmers Bryce, George Raphael Fleming,J.S. Thomson, J.K. Brown (all Glasgow Academicals)
James Howe McClure, J. Kennedy, J.P. Tennant, Robert Wilson, G. Hunter, A. Cochrane (all West of Scotland)
J.W. Reid (Glasgow University)

After the initial match at Burnbank, the games rotated - in the twice a season format - between Raeburn Place in Edinburgh and Hamilton Crescent in Partick, Glasgow.

Selection of representative players

Often to aid the selection process of Glasgow District's players a trial match was played.

In Glasgow's case a trial match of hopefuls were divided into Blues and Whites teams, so the players could impress the selectors.

Glasgow also played a 'Rest of the West' team for selection.

Early history

The Inter-City

With the exception of the first four years, the Glasgow v Edinburgh district fixture was more or less played annually; only being beaten by World War and occasional inclement weather.

Typically the Glasgow District side, in its early history, was crammed with Scottish international players.

The Glasgow team for the 5 December 1874 match is an example:
 William Davie Brown  [captain] ᵜ , James Stewart Carrick ᵜ  (both Glasgow Academicals)
 Malcolm Cross ᵜ  (Glasgow Academicals), William Hamilton Kidston ᵜ  (West of Scotland)
 James Howe McClure ᵜ , George Buchanan McClure ᵜ  (both West of Scotland), John Kennedy Tod ᵜ  (Glasgow Academicals)
 Gilbert Heron ᵜ, Charles Chalmers Bryce ᵜ , Allan Arthur ᵜ , Henry William Allan ᵜ , George Raphael Fleming ᵜ  (all Glasgow Academicals)
Tom Paterson Neilson ᵜ , John Alexander Neilson ᵜ , J.S. Kennedy, Preston (West of Scotland)
C.E. McArthur, Henry Melville Napier ᵜ , W.B. Russell, J. Hutchison (Glasgow University)

ᵜ Marked as Scottish internationalists.

The first 15-a-side match was played on 29 January 1876.

From the Inter-City formation in 1872, Edinburgh won the first two fixtures. Six draws followed, then came sporadic Edinburgh wins and draws. It wasn't until the 13th inter-city tie that Glasgow won the fixture.

The first winning Glasgow side in 1881:

David Kidston (G. Academicals), A. J. W. Reid and C. W. Dunlop (West of Scotland),John Alexander Neilson (West of Scotland) and C. Ker (G. Academicals),D. Y. Cassels [captain], D. McGowan, A. Walker, R. Adam (West of Scotland), R. B. Young, J. Lang (Glasgow University),John Blair Brown, R. A. Kerr, William Andrew Walls, G. H. Robb (G. Academicals).

Glasgow then held dominance until 1887 when once more Edinburgh won again. From the 1880s to the close of the 1890s Edinburgh won a total of only four times in 20-years. The tide turned back in Edinburgh's favour in 1898. With only a solitary Glasgow win in 1905, Edinburgh held sway until 1914.

Hamilton Crescent, New Anniesland, Old Anniesland

The games were postponed during the First World War period. After around 50-years at Hamilton Crescent – the West of Scotland ground in Woodlands, Glasgow – the Glasgow v Edinburgh fixture moved to Glasgow Academical's ground at New Anniesland, Glasgow, in 1921. This move prompted yet another shift in balance as Glasgow once again became the dominant force of the two districts. The fixture moved to Glasgow HSFP's ground Old Anniesland in 1927.

Rugby Union

To coincide with the Scottish Football Union changing its name to the Scottish Rugby Union in 1924, the SRU made the Glasgow District Union into the Glasgow District Rugby Union that same year.

Touring sides

Glasgow often played matches against international and non-international touring teams. Occasionally both Glasgow and Edinburgh would field joint teams against the international touring teams.

One strange example is that of the New South Wales Waratahs world tour in 1927–28. They played against Glasgow District on 12 October 1927. Due to collapse of the Queensland Rugby Union they effectively were a de facto Australian national rugby team at the time and the Australian Rugby Union have decreed that their international matches of that tour should be taken as full tests. In the match against Glasgow, the Waratahs won 10–0.

Scottish Inter-District Championship

Two other Scottish districts South and North and Midlands had also been formed and there was regular matches between the four Scottish districts as well as against the touring sides.

The Scottish Inter-District Championship was established in the 1953–54 season. The Glasgow, Edinburgh, South and North and Midlands sides would play off to see which district was best in Scotland. From 1981 an Anglo-Scots or Scottish Exiles team was also invited into this championship.

Glasgow v South 23 October 1973 match report
Glasgow v North and Midlands 4 January 1975 match report

Famously the 1989 Glasgow District side went through the entire 1989–90 season undefeated:- winning the Scottish Inter-District Championship outright; drawing 18–18 with Munster away; winning 21–6 against Connacht away; and winning against Fiji

Glasgow Inter-District Championship-winning squad 1989–1990.

Graeme Smillie (Glasgow Academicals)

Dave Barrett, Matt Duncan, Dave McKee (West of Scotland), Ian Jardine, George Graham, Kevin McKenzie, Brian Robertson, Stewart Hamilton (all Stirling County), Derek Stark, Phil Manning, David McVey (Ayr), George Breckenridge, Ewan McCorkindale, Alan Watt, Shade Munro, Fergus Wallace, Derek Busby (all Glasgow High Kelvinside), Stewart McAslan (Glasgow Academicals), David Jackson (Hillhead Jordanhill).

Age grades

The Scottish Inter-District Championship was also contested at Age Grade level. The Under 21 Glasgow District side won for the first time in 1986–87 season. With players like Shade Munro, Andrew Garry, Gordon Mackay, Gerry Hawkes and Murray Wallace in that side, it gave a good foundation for the 1989–90 season triumph and these young players later went on to represent the fledgling professional Glasgow side.

Effect of professionalism

With the advent of professionalism in 1995, the Scottish Rugby Union realised that not even the best semi-professional Scottish club teams could compete in the new Professional Era in rugby union, which was beginning to gain great momentum in the professional leagues of the Southern Hemisphere and the Northern Hemisphere.

In an attempt to stay in touch with the leading nations the SRU formed four professional teams out of the four amateur districts of Scotland in 1996. It was these newly professional teams that would represent Scotland in the Heineken Cup and in the Celtic League. The amateur Glasgow District side was to become the professional Glasgow Warriors side.

For the subsequent history of the professional Glasgow rugby district team from 1996, see Glasgow Warriors.

Rebirth of the amateur district

Glasgow District, or Glasgow and the West, as an amateur district, will return in the 2022–23 Amateur Scottish Inter-District Championship. Its Head Coach will be Kenny Diffenthal of Marr Rugby, aided by assistant coaches Thomas Davidson (Glasgow Hawks) and Stephen Adair (Marr).

Diffenthal noted:
It is indeed a great honour and privilege to be selected as Head Coach of Glasgow and the West. Looking ahead, it’s going to be a tough competition, entering the unknown mixing clubs and coaches, but it is an exciting challenge and a great opportunity to bring together talented players from across the District. I have a great team with Thomas and Stephen assisting me and we are looking forward to working closely together to build a strong squad.

Records and Achievements

Honours

The Glasgow District won the Scottish Inter-District Championship outright in 1955–56, 1973–74 and 1989–90.

It also shared the Scottish Inter-District Championship six times: 1964–65, 1967–68, 1972–73, 1974–75, 1975–76 and 1977–78.

Season standings

Inter-City

Glasgow score given first.  ᵜ  Previous to 1876 only goals counted; tries were ignored in the result.

Scoreline key:

Twice a season matches

1st 1872 - 73 match played at Burnbank Park in Woodlands, Glasgow;2nd 1872 - 73 match played at Raeburn Place in Stockbridge, Edinburgh
1st 1873 - 74 match played at Raeburn Place. 2nd 1873 - 74 match played at Hamilton Crescent in Partick, Glasgow.
1st 1874 - 75 match played at Hamilton Crescent; 2nd 1874 - 75 match played at Raeburn Place.
1st 1875 - 76 match played at Hamilton Crescent; 2nd 1875 - 76 match played at Raeburn Place.

Annual matches

 * 1885 match played at the 2nd Hampden Park - the modern Hampden Park is the 3rd park with that name. The 2nd Hampden Park was renamed as New Cathkin Park and taken over by Third Lanark.

Scottish Inter-District Championship

The Inter-City match was then incorporated into the Scottish Inter-District Championship. For Glasgow's professional championship results from 1996 see Glasgow Warriors; for results of later Glasgow - Edinburgh matches see 1872 Cup.

Professional Era

The Amateur Scottish Inter-District Championship has been restarted twice in the professional era. The first restart was from 1999 to 2002; the second restart from the 2022-23 season.

Partial list of games played against international opposition

Notable former players

British and Irish Lions from Glasgow District

The following former Glasgow District players have represented the British and Irish Lions.

Notable non-Scottish players

The following is a list of notable non-Scottish international representative former Glasgow players:

See also
Glasgow Warriors

References

External links
Glasgow v South 8 December 1894 match report
South v Glasgow, 27 October 1964 Match Report
Edinburgh v Glasgow 4 December 1965 match report
Glasgow v Edinburgh 22 November 1966 match report
Glasgow v Edinburgh 14 November 1967 match report
Glasgow v Edinburgh match report 5 December 1981
Rugby title without a trophy, early history of inter-city matches, Glasgow Herald, 2 December 1980
History of Glasgow District matches, Glasgow Herald, 18 March 1981

Scottish rugby union teams
Rugby clubs established in 1872
Scottish Inter-District Championship teams
District
Rugby union in Glasgow
Scottish District sides